Trash Taste is a weekly audio and video podcast hosted by Joey Bizinger, Garnt Maneetapho, and Connor Colquhoun – three Tokyo-based content creators primarily focusing on anime and Japanese pop culture. The podcast generally discusses Japanese culture and life in Japan.

History 
The podcast was started in February 2020 by GeeXPlus, a subsidiary of BookWalker, who helped the three hosts to relocate to Japan to help them have more access to Japanese culture and to promote their products on their channel. Since the three were brought over in Japan, they decided to start a podcast that was already planned on the back of their minds for some time. The first episode of the podcast was uploaded to YouTube on 5 June 2020. Since then, new episodes have been released every Friday, with exception when YouTube-exclusive specials were released instead. 

On 26 January 2021, the first live show called Trash Taste After Dark was broadcast on Twitch. This was followed-up on 19 February when they co-streamed the 5th Crunchyroll Anime Awards. 

On 26 May 2021, the hosts moved out of the studio in which they had recorded the first fifty-four episodes, dubbed season one, and relocated to a new studio that officially kicked-off season two. On 17 June 2021, the hosts were invited for a live 'podcast' event about Japan-based YouTubers by the Foreign Correspondents' Club of Japan; discussions range from living in Japan to how Trash Taste got started. Trash Taste also appeared in the Foreign Correspondent Club Japan's Number 1 Shimbun Magazine June 2021 volume. 

On 19 March 2022, they hosted a 24-hour long charity event for Doctors Without Borders on Twitch, raising a total of $181,000 in donations.

In May–July 2022, Trash Taste podcast recordings were done outside of Japan for the first time. This included three episodes in London, eight episodes in Los Angeles, and one Trash Taste After Dark episode at the Twitch Australia studio in Sydney (aired 17 July 2022). These episodes were released on 10 June through 9 September 2022. Also during this time, the hosts held Q&A/discussion panels and special events at MCM London Comic Con, Anime Expo, Florida Supercon, and SMASH! In October 2022, during the Trash Taste 2022 Tour, the hosts participated at the New York Comic Con and had an impromptu podcast recording in Tampa, Florida (aired 25 November 2022).

Format 
Discussions in the podcast are about more than just anime, and delve into various topics, including otaku culture, life in Japan, and topics varying on the episode's theme. The show will occasionally have a special guest that will have an entire episode devoted to. Past guests included:

 Akidearest
 Anthony Padilla
 Chris Broad (five appearances)
 Daidus
 Emirichu (two appearances)
 Geno Samuel
 Jacksepticeye
 Jessica Nigri
 Kaho Shibuya
 Ken Arto
 Kevin Penkin
 Kson
 Ladybeard
 LilyPichu
 Ludwig Ahgren
 Meilyne Tran (two appearances)
 Michael Reeves
 Mori Calliope (two appearances)
 Nano
 Noriyaro
 NileRed
 Penguinz0
 PewDiePie
 Pokimane
 PremierTwo
 ProZD
 Reina Scully
 Shindo L
 Shu Uchida
 Sydsnap
 Sykkuno
 William Osman

Generally, each episode is between one and three hours long, and is broken up intermittently with sponsor spots and a list of all Patreon subscribers near the end. The intro and outro title card both feature the copyright-free song "Soul Searching" by Causmic. 

The podcast's producer is Meilyne Tran, with video editing by Tomas Liismus (MudanTV).

Tour 

On 23 September 2022, Trash Taste podcast embarked on its first live tour with a total of 23 stops in the following cities: Los Angeles, St. Paul, Chicago, Cleveland, Detroit, Toronto, Boston, Philadelphia, New York City, Washington D.C., Raleigh, Nashville, Orlando, Dallas, Austin, Kansas City, Denver, Salt Lake City, Phoenix, San Francisco, Seattle, with their last show being in Portland on 30 October.

YouTube 
The Trash Taste podcast has four channels on YouTube. The main channel, Trash Taste, was created on 14 February 2020 and includes all podcast episodes and specials. Trash Taste After Dark (originally called Trash Taste Streams) was created on 23 August 2019 and features the recorded livestreams from the podcast's Twitch channel and behind the scenes videos. Trash Taste Highlights, created on 14 February 2020, and Trash Taste Shorts, created on 11 March 2022, both provide short clips from each podcast episode that are significant or interesting. All four channels have received a silver YouTube Play Button for surpassing 100,000 subscribers; while only the main channel has received the gold YouTube Play Button for surpassing one million subscribers, which it achieved on 17 July 2021.

Specials
Typically debuting on a week in which no episode of the podcast is released, the specials, available exclusively on YouTube, feature the hosts of Trash Taste outside the studio.

Podcast episodes

Season 1 (2020–2021)

Season 2 (2021–2022)

Season 3 (2022–present)

Reception
General public reception have been mostly positive, with several podcast review sites giving five-star ratings, or rank high in various categories, including Apple Podcasts and Podbay.fm.

References

External links 
 
 
 

YouTube channels launched in 2020
2020 podcast debuts
Film and television podcasts
Audio podcasts
Video podcasts
Interview podcasts
Patreon creators